APIM may refer to:
 API Management (Computer Science); a way to create API (application programming interface) gateways for back-end services using products such as Apigee, Azure API Management, TIBCO Mashery, Mulesoft, WSO2, AWS API Gateway.
 OCP-APIM, an open-source API Management developed by Microsoft and the Open Compute Project
 AEEC (Airlines Electronic Engineering Committee) Project Initiation/Modification
 Asia Pacific Institute of Management
 Ford Sync, Accessory Protocol Interface Module
 Lille Metropole Development Agency